Jim Clark (24 May 1931 – 25 February 2016) was a British film editor and film director. He has more than forty feature film credits between 1956 and 2008. Clark directed eight features and short films. Among his most recognized films are Midnight Cowboy (1969, as creative consultant), Marathon Man (1976), The Killing Fields (1984), and Vera Drake (2004). In 2011, Clark published Dream Repairman: Adventures in Film Editing, a memoir of his career.

Early life
Clark was born in 1931, and grew up in Boston, Lincolnshire. He was educated at Oundle School in Northamptonshire and founded the Oundle Film Society in 1947.

Career
Clark moved to London, and in 1951 began work as an assistant editor at Ealing Studios. Subsequently he worked as a freelance assistant editor on two films directed by Stanley Donen and edited by Jack Harris. When Harris declined the opportunity to work on Donen's subsequent film, Surprise Package (1960), Donen gave Clark the job. As Clark later wrote, 

He received an Academy Award and a BAFTA Award for the editing of The Killing Fields (1984, directed by Roland Joffé); he received a second BAFTA Award for editing The Mission (1986, Joffé). Clark was also nominated for BAFTA Awards for his editing of the films Marathon Man (1976, directed by John Schlesinger) and Vera Drake (2004, directed by Mike Leigh). In 2005, Clark received the American Cinema Editors Career Achievement Award.

Responding to a question about the major influences on his editing, Clark said 

As a director he was responsible for Every Home Should Have One (1970), Rentadick (1972) and Madhouse (1974).

Personal life and memoir
Clark lived in Kensington with his wife Laurence Méry-Clark, likewise a film and television editor. They married in 1961 and had three children. Clark's autobiography Dream Repairman: Adventures in Film Editing was published in 2011, receiving warm reviews from The Guardian and The Observer.

See also
List of film director and editor collaborations - Clark's collaboration with director John Schlesinger extended over about sixteen years and eight films. Midnight Cowboy (1969) and Marathon Man (1976) are among their most recognized films. Hugh A. Robertson is credited as the editor for Midnight Cowboy, with Clark being a "creative consultant"; Robertson won the BAFTA Award for Best Editing and was nominated for the Academy Award for Best Film Editing for the film.

References

External links
 

1931 births
2016 deaths
Best Editing BAFTA Award winners
Best Film Editing Academy Award winners
British film editors
English television editors
People educated at Oundle School